Mandal Legislative Assembly constituency is one of the 200 Legislative Assembly constituencies of Rajasthan state in India.

It is part of Bhilwara district.

Members of the Legislative Assembly

Election results

2018

See also
 List of constituencies of the Rajasthan Legislative Assembly
 Bhilwara district

References

Bhilwara district
Assembly constituencies of Rajasthan